National Route 473 is a national highway of Japan connecting between Gamagōri and Makinohara in Japan. It has a total length of 247.8 km (153.98 mi).

References

473
Roads in Aichi Prefecture
Roads in Shizuoka Prefecture